The men's pole vault at the 2012 European Athletics Championships was held at the Helsinki Olympic Stadium on 30 June and 1 July.

Medalists

Records

Schedule

Results

Qualification
Qualification: Qualification Performance 5.60 (Q) or at least 12 best performers advance to the final

Final

References

Qualification Results
Final Results

Pole vault
Pole vault at the European Athletics Championships